A Trappist is a monk or nun of the Order of Cistercians of the Strict Observance

Trappist may also refer to:
 TRAPPIST, Transiting Planets and Planetesimals Small Telescope
 TRAPPIST-1, star system found using TRAPPIST
 Products made at Trappist monasteries:
 Trappist beer
 Trappista cheese
 Trappist Dairy (Hong Kong) Limited
 Trappist Sign Language, monastic sign language used by Trappists

Distinguish
 Trapper (disambiguation)